The Rawhide Buttes Stage Station, the Running Water Stage Station and the Cheyenne-Black Hills Stage Route comprise a historic district that commemorates the stage coach route between Cheyenne, Wyoming and Deadwood, South Dakota. The route operated beginning in 1876, during the height of the Black Hills Gold Rush, and was replaced in 1887 by a railroad.

The Rawhide Buttes station was demolished in 1973 after having functioned as a ranch headquarters. Running Water saw a minor mining boom during the 1880s, but was superseded by Lusk.

The district was listed on the National Register of Historic Places in 1969.

References

External links
 at the National Park Service's NRHP database
Cheyenne-Black Hills Stage Route Historic District at the Wyoming State Historic Preservation Office

Geography of Niobrara County, Wyoming
Historic districts on the National Register of Historic Places in Wyoming
National Register of Historic Places in Niobrara County, Wyoming
Stagecoach stations on the National Register of Historic Places in Wyoming
Demolished buildings and structures in Wyoming
1876 establishments in Wyoming Territory
Buildings and structures demolished in 1973
1973 disestablishments in Wyoming